Batory is the Polish spelling of the name of the Hungarian Báthory noble family.

People
 Don Batory, an American computer scientist
 Ivan Bátory (born 1975), a Slovak cross-country skier
 Jan Batory (1921-1981), a Polish film director
 Józef Batory (1914-1951), a Polish soldier and resistance fighter
 Ronald Batory (born 1950), an American railroad executive and administrator
 Stefan Batory (1533-1586), King of Poland from 1576 to 1586

Ships
 , a 1932-built patrol boat in the Polish Border Guard and, later, Navy
 , an ocean liner launched in 1935 and scrapped in 1971
 , an ocean liner built in 1952 and scrapped in 2000

Other uses
 Chorzów Batory, a district of the Polish city of Chorzów
 Stefan Batory Foundation, a Polish NGO supporting the development of democracy in Poland and elsewhere

See also
 Bathory (disambiguation)